SSA may refer to:

Geography
 Sub-Saharan Africa

Organizations
 Safe Schools Alliance, a British advocacy group
 SSA Global Technologies, American software company acquired by Infor Global Solutions
 Shan State Army, a former insurgent group in Burma
 Slovak Society of Actuaries, professional association in Slovakia
 Soaring Society of America, American sporting society founded in 1932
 Society of Scottish Artists, artists society founded in 1891
 Swedish Society of Radio Amateurs, an amateur radio organization
 Singapore Scout Association, youth movement founded 1910
 Seismological Society of America, international scientific society founded1906
 Scottish Socialist Alliance, a coalition of left-wing bodies, fore-runner to the Scottish Socialist Party
 Shipconstructors' and Shipwrights' Association, a former British trade union
 Sainsbury's Staff Association, of Sainsbury's, UK
 Sudan Studies Association, US professional association
 Society for the Study of Addiction, UK learned society with charitable status
 Steamship Authority, a Massachusetts ferry service and regulatory body

Education
 School of Saint Anthony, Quezon City, Philippines
 Secular Student Alliance, US
 Shady Side Academy, Pittsburgh, Pennsylvania, US

Government
 Social Security Administration of the US government
 Social Security Agency (Northern Ireland)
 State Security Agency (South Africa), the South African intelligence service
 Selective Service Act of 1917, an American piece of legislation signed by President Woodrow Wilson during WWI that established nationwide conscription

Computing
 Software Security Assurance
 Serial Storage Architecture
 Singular Spectrum Analysis
 Stationary Subspace Analysis
 Static single-assignment form, a property of intermediate representations used in compilers
 Stochastic Simulation Algorithm
 Strong subadditivity of quantum entropy
 SubStation Alpha and .ssa file format, a video subtitle editor
 Super systolic array
 Start of Selected Area, a control character in the C1 control code set
 Solid State Array, in flash data storage using solid-state drives

Science
 Semantic structure analysis
 Single-strand annealing in homologous recombination
 Specific surface area, a property of solids
 Side-side-angle in geometry for solving triangles

Medicine
 Senile systemic amyloidosis
 Sessile serrated adenoma, a type of pre-malignant intestinal polyp
 Special somatic afferent
 Anti-SSA/Ro autoantibodies
 Sulfosalicylic acid

Other uses
 SSA, Grand Cross of the Order of the Star of South Africa
 Deputado Luís Eduardo Magalhães International Airport, IATA Airport code
 Same sex attraction
 Sarva Shiksha Abhiyan, the Government of India's Education for All programme
 Self-sampling assumption
 Shared services agreement
 Slippery slope argument, a rhetorical device (and often a fallacy)
 ESA Space Situational Awareness Programme
 Special services area or business improvement district
 Special Service Agreement between the UN and a contractor
 Supervisory Special Agent
 Serious Sam Advance, a 2004 video game